Digimon Adventure, Digimon Adventure 02, Digimon Adventure tri. and Digimon Adventure: Last Evolution Kizuna anime series and films produced by Toei Animation for the Digimon franchise, are centered on the , a group of children chosen to protect the Digital World. Each child is partnered with a Digimon and use a Digivice to help them Digivolve into stronger forms.

The main DigiDestined cast was designed by Katsuyoshi Nakatsuru. Producer Satoru Nishizono and the staff used a name analysis software to decide on the characters' names, using kanji combinations that related to "luck". For Digimon Adventure tri., director Keitaro Motonaga found that some parts of developing the characters were "difficult to control" due to the characters' "strong personalities", but the staff had "rebuilt" the characters by taking account of their personal growth while retaining their original personalities. A new group of DigiDestined, in addition to T.K. and Kari, were made into the new main cast for Digimon Adventure 02, consisting of Davis, Yolei, Cody and later Ken.

Main characters

Adventure protagonists 
 
 
 Tai is the leader of the DigiDestined, the star player on the school's soccer team and Kari's older brother. His aggressive and impulsive personality often puts him in danger, but he learns that empathy and compassion are the keys to being a successful leader.
 Tai passing on leadership to Davis during the events of Digimon Adventure 02 while attending middle school. During the events of Digimon Adventure tri., Tai bonds with Daigo Nishijima and is inspired by the man to seek out a career in diplomacy. The Digimon Adventure 02 series epilogue depicts Tai and Agumon become diplomats for their respective worlds, with Tai having a son who is partnered to a Koromon.

 
 
 Matt is T.K.'s older brother. He lives in Odaiba with his father after his parents divorced three years prior. He takes caution in the Digital World, especially when it comes to T.K.'s safety, and often clashes with Tai, due to the latter's recklessness.
 In Digimon Adventure 02, Matt forms a band with his classmates called the Teen-age Wolves and provides lead vocals and bass. In Digimon Adventure tri., he becomes the vocalist and bassist of Knife of Day after the Teen-age Wolves disbands. In the series' epilogue, Matt and Gabumon become astronauts. Matt marries Sora and they have two children; a daughter with a Yokomon and a son with a Tsunomon.

 
 
 Sora is Tai's best friend and was on the soccer team with him. Despite being tomboyish, Sora takes caution in the Digital World and serves as the mother figure of the DigiDestined, often acting as a mediator between Tai and Matt.
 In Digimon Adventure 02, Sora takes up tennis and flower arranging, learning both from her mother. In the series' epilogue, Sora and Biyomon become fashion designers. Sora has married Matt and they have two children; a daughter with a Yokomon and a son with a Tsunomon.

 
 
 Izzy is a computer expert and enjoys researching the Internet. His intellectual curiosity is strong, but sometimes, he becomes too absorbed to focus on his surroundings. He politely defers to the rest of the DigiDestined. When he initially found out that he was adopted, he began to subconsciously distance himself from his parents, focusing more on his computer instead. However, they later come to accept each other as family.
 In Digimon Adventure 02, Izzy continues to aid the new generation of DigiDestined by using his computer expertise to monitor the Digital World and alert them about any problems. In Digimon Adventure tri., Izzy works at a new company in the IT business with the base office of operations, creating a program for their partners to travel back and forth between every monitor and the outside world. In the series' epilogue, Izzy researches gateways to the Real and Digital Worlds with Sora's father and Joe's brother, Shu. He has a daughter with a Motimon.

 
 
 Mimi is a beautiful girl in Izzy's class who has lived a sheltered life under wealthy parents. She tends to push responsibility onto others when things are difficult for her, but people can't help but be charmed by her straightforward personality.
 In Digimon Adventure 02, Mimi moves to New York City, but she manages to make her way to the Digital World on occasion. In Digimon Adventure tri., Mimi moves back to Japan and enrolls in Tai's high school.
 In the series' epilogue, Mimi and Palmon have become celebrity chefs and have a cooking show. She has a son with a Tanemon as his partner Digimon.
 In a series of online polls conducted on the Digimon website, Mimi was ranked 6th by Japanese voters as Favorite DigiDestined. When the same question was asked three more times, her rank rose to 3rd, fell to 9th, and failed to chart on the final poll. Mimi is ranked first as the DigiDestined whom voters related to the most.

 
 
 Joe is an honor student and comes from a family of high-ranked professionals. He spends time studying to enter a high-ranked university and become a physician. Because he is the oldest, he feels responsible for their safety, but his indecisiveness means the group looks to others when making choices.
 In Digimon Adventure 02, Joe is still studying to be a doctor and passes his responsibilities to Cody Hida. In the series' epilogue, Joe has become the Digital World's first doctor. He has a son, who has a Bukamon.
 In Digimon Adventure tri., Joe is reluctant to rejoin the DigiDestined, prioritizing his studies over fighting, but eventually finds the resolve to continue fighting.

 
 
 T.K. is Matt's younger brother. Unlike the others, he lives in Setagaya with his mother due to their parents' divorce, and despite this, T.K. avoids talking about it. T.K. idolizes Matt and wants to impress him, but he opens up to the other DigiDestined and follows their lead without complaints, particularly Tai.
 In Digimon Adventure 02, T.K. and his mother move to Odaiba, where Cody and Yolei are his neighbors. He has grown taller and is the ace of the basketball club. He is gentle and friendly, so he is popular with girls, but he seems not to have much interest. In the series' epilogue, T.K. has become a novelist, having written books about his and the other DigiDestined's adventures in the Digital World. He has a son with a Tokomon. In a series of online polls conducted on the Digimon website, T.K. was ranked 7th by Japanese voters as Favorite DigiDestined. When the same question was asked two more times, his rank rose to 2nd, but fell to 3rd. T.K. is also ranked 1st as whom the voters would want as a younger brother and as the DigiDestined whom the voters thought was the strongest. He placed 2nd as the DigiDestined voters would want to switch places with and as the best-looking DigiDestined in the winter. When voters were asked which DigiDestined they would want as their boyfriend, T.K. placed in 3rd.

 
 
 Kari is Tai's younger sister, a gentle, compassionate girl who puts others before herself. She was unable to come to camp due to a cold, but was eventually revealed to be the eighth DigiDestined child. Kari admires Tai and is considered T.K.'s equal. She is highly perceptive of her environment and Digimon, but this also leaves her vulnerable to the Dark Ocean and being possessed by Homeostasis.
 In Digimon Adventure 02, Kari has grown to be a charmingly, energetic, and bright girl. The gentleness and the sense of responsibility remain the same as in the past, but sometimes could be "mischievous" and "playful" . She becomes pretty interested in photography and she always carries a digital camera. In the series' epilogue, Kari becomes a kindergarten teacher with a son who has inherited her whistle and has a Salamon as his partner Digimon. Originally, Kari was not planned to appear, but halfway into Digimon Adventures broadcast, Nishizono decided to add her as a character, having been influenced by how "cute" she looked in the 1999 film. In a series of online polls conducted on the Digimon website, Kari was ranked 4th by Japanese voters as their favorite DigiDestined. When the same question was asked two more times, her rank fell to 5th, and then 6th, but finally landed at 1st. In addition, Kari is ranked as 1st, whom the voters would want as a younger sister and as the best-looking DigiDestined in the spring. She placed in 3rd as the DigiDestined who the voters thought was the strongest and as the best-looking DigiDestined in the winter.

 Partner Digimon 
This page only includes the forms shown in the anime. Many of these characters gained alternate digivolutions in spin off media.

 
 
 Agumon is a short-length Tyrannosaurus Rex-like Digimon who is Tai's partner. He is laid-back and simple-minded. Agumon always believes Tai has the best interests for the team and trusts him as a friend. His main attacks are flame-based.
 is Agumon's Baby form, a botamochi-like Digimon covered in black fur.
 is Agumon's In-training form, a pink spherical Digimon with rabbit-like ears.
 is Agumon's Champion form, a giant Dinosaur Digimon with a rhinoceros beetle-like helmet on his head. 
 is Agumon's Ultimate form, a cyborg Dinosaur Digimon with wings and missile hatches on his chest.
 is a corrupted version of MetalGreymon, who first and only appeared in Digimon Adventure 02 when the Digimon Emperor tests his new Dark Spiral on Greymon. 
 is Agumon's alternate Ultimate form, a Virus-type skeleton Dinosaur Digimon. SkullGreymon first appeared in Digimon Adventure, when Tai forces Greymon to Dark Digivolve in order to fight another Greymon by putting himself in harm's way. He appeared again in Digimon Adventure 02, when the Digimon Emperor took control of Greymon with one of his Dark Rings and forced him to take this form.
 is Agumon's Mega form, a Dragon-Man Digimon with the powerful Dramon Killers equipped on his both arms.
 is Agumon's final form, a Digivolution forged by the bond between Agumon and Tai. This form only appears in Digimon Adventure: Last Evolution Kizuna during the final battle with Eosmon.

 
 
 Gabumon is a reptile-like Digimon wearing a wolf pelt and Matt's partner. He is shy and very loyal to Matt. While Gabumon reasons with him whenever he falls too far, he still supports and trusts Matt with any decision he makes. His Digivolutions have ice-based attacks.
 is Gabumon's Baby form, a squishy round Digimon with three horns on his head.
 is Gabumon's In-training form, a spherical Digimon with orange fur and a horn above his face.
 is Gabumon's Champion form, a giant wolf Digimon with an incredible agility.
 is Gabumon's Ultimate form, a bipedal werewolf Digimon with very sharp claws.
 is Gabumon's Mega form, an cyborg wolf Digimon with built-in weaponry and flight capability via his blade-shaped wings.
  is Gabumon's final form, a Digivolution forged by the bond between Gabumon and Matt. This form only appears in Digimon Adventure: Last Evolution Kizuna during the final fight with Eosmon.

 
 
 Biyomon is a little bird-like Digimon who is Sora's partner. She is expressive about her feelings and is affectionate towards Sora. She helps Sora open up to her mother and mends their relationship. Biyomon and her Digivolution's attacks are flame-based.
 is Biyomon's Baby form, a black seed-like Digimon with a sprout on her head.
 is Biyomon's In-training form, who looks like an onion bulb with root-like tentacles and a flower growing on her head.
 is Biyomon's Champion form, a giant bird Digimon who is enveloped with blazing flames. 
 is Biyomon's Ultimate form, a Garuda-based Digimon with gigantic talons and wings.
 is Biyomon's Mega form, a holy four-winged Phoenix Digimon.

 
 
 Tentomon is a ladybug-like Digimon and Izzy's partner. He speaks in a Kansai dialect. He has the ability to digivolve into insect-type forms with electric-based attacks. He is highly intelligent, curious, and polite. Although he admires and is fascinated by Izzy's curiosity, he cannot understand it and is baffled by Izzy preferring his laptop over socializing with his friends. Tentomon occasionally becomes annoyed when Izzy becomes sidetracked by his curiosity.
 is Tentomon's Baby form, a blob-like Digimon who always holds a pacifier in his mouth.
 is Tentomon's In-training form, a cylinder-shaped blob Digimon.
 is Tentomon's Champion form, a giant four-armed Asiatic rhinoceros beetle Digimon.
 is Tentomon's Ultimate form, a giant four-armed Japanese rhinoceros beetle Digimon.
 is Tentomon's Mega form, a gigantic Atlas beetle Digimon armed with enormous horn and scissors.

 
 
Palmon is a plant-like Digimon with reptilian features who often sees the good in Mimi and often tries to make her partner appreciate what she has. When Mimi first leaves the Digital World, Palmon is unable to say goodbye to her. In the series' epilogue, she and Mimi become celebrity chefs and have their own cooking show.
 is Palmon's Baby form, a seed Digimon covered in long hair.
 is Palmon's In-training form, a bulb Digimon with two leaves sprouting from her head.
 is Palmon's Champion form, a humanoid cactus Digimon who wears boxing gloves. Togemon can fire the needles of her body at a great speed.
 is Palmon's Ultimate form, a flower fairy Digimon with four leaf-like wings. She can combine the flowers in her hands to form a big cannon.
 is Palmon's Mega form, an alluring fairy Digimon armed with a whip as her weapon of choice.

 
 
 Gomamon is a seal-like Digimon and Joe's partner. He has the ability to digivolve into seal-type forms with water-based attacks. Gomamon has a laid-back and easygoing personality, where he often attempts to convince Joe to overcome his fears and socialize instead of studying. 
 is Gomamon's Baby form, a microbe-like Digimon with a very small size.
 is Gomamon's In-training form, a baby aquatic Dinosaur Digimon.
 is Gomamon's Champion form, a walrus-like Digimon that can use his horn as a missile.
 is Gomamon's Ultimate form, a bipedal walrus-like Digimon with a turtle shell. He uses spark-based attacks with his Thor Hammer.
 is Gomamon's Mega form, a Beast Man Digimon with the appearance of a Viking walrus. He uses ice-based attacks with the morning star Mjölnir that carries on his back.

 
 
 Patamon is a pudgy guinea pig-like Digimon with bat wing ears and T.K.'s partner. Due to T.K.'s young age in Adventure, initially he is the last to digivolve into higher forms. In Adventure, he sacrifices himself to defeat Devimon, recomposing into a Digi-Egg afterwards. Because of this, T.K. is sometimes reluctant to let him fight.
 is Patamon's Baby form, a blob Digimon with traslucent body.
 is Patamon's In-training form, a sharp-toothed Digimon with tiny limbs.
, is Patamon's Armor form when he uses the Digi-Egg of Hope to Digivolve, a pegasus-like Holy Beast Digimon.
 is Patamon's Champion form, a muscular Angel Digimon with six wings and holy powers. Angemon wears a mask on his face with the Christian cross.
 is Patamon's Ultimate form, an Archangel Digimon with eight wings and holy ribbons around his body.
 is Patamon's alternate Ultimate form, the DNA Digivolution between Ankylomon and Angemon. Shakkoumon is a Shakōki-dogū-based Digimon who combines Ankylomon's armor with Angemon's holy powers.
 is Patamon's Mega form, a Seraph Digimon with ten wings dressed in a holy armor, who wears a star-shaped mask that hiddes his face.

 
 
 Gatomon is an exalted beast Digimon in the form of a bipedal cat and Kari's partner, wearing a special ring on her tail that gives her extra strength and prevents dark energy from spreading. Unlike the others, she is a Champion-level Digimon and displays a more mature behavior due to her complicated past. In both versions of the series, Gatomon is initially introduced as an antagonist who joins the DigiDestined upon being reunited with her partner.
 Due to Gennai losing her Digi-Egg while evading the Dark Masters, Gatomon ends up in the forced employ of Myotismon with Wizardmon as her only companion before he convinced her to defect to the DigDestined upon helping her realize she is Kari’s partner. In Digimon Adventure 02, Gatomon loses her ring after being attacked by a Dark Ring-controlled Unimon, but retrieves it from Gennai at the end of the series.
 is Gatomon's Baby form, a tiny cat-like Digimon.
 is Gatomon's rookie form, a puppy-like Digimon with holy powers, although is unable to manifest them.
 is Gatomon's Armor form when she uses the Digi-Egg of Light to Digivolve, a winged sphinx-like Holy Beast Digimon. 
 is Gatomon's Ultimate form, an Archangel Digimon with the appearance of a beautiful woman. Only in Digimon Adventure tri., Angewomon is portrayed using lipstick.
 is Gatomon's alternate Ultimate form, the DNA Digivolution between Aquilamon and Gatomon. Silphymon is a harpy-like Digimon who combines Gatomon's ears and Aquilamon's legs, tailfeathers, and wingfeathers. 
 is Gatomon's Mega form, a God Dragon Digimon with ten wings.
 is a corrupted version of Ophanimon. In Digimon Adventure tri., when Kari believes Tai had died in Coexistence, her overwhelmingly negative emotions force Nyaromon to warp digivolve into this form, before fusing with Raguelmon to become Ordinemon.

 
 

holds the "Garuru Cannon" and his left WarGreymon hand conceals the "Grey Sword", while his left arm also has the "Brave Shield Omega". Omnimon first appeared in Digimon Adventure: Our War Game! to battle Diaboromon, thanks to the power given from all who were watching their fight through the Internet.
 is a Mode Change of Omnimon, who first appeared in Digimon Adventure tri., "Our Future" when all the Digidestined' Partner Digimon power up Omnimon in order to destroy Ordinemon.

 Adventure 02 protagonists 
 
 
 Davis is the leader of the new DigiDestined, wearing Tai's goggles after losing his own during battle. He has a one-sided crush on Kari and is jealous of her friendship with T.K. Though impulsive and simple-minded, Davis values his friends and is strongly dedicated to protecting them.
 In the series' epilogue, Davis has opened a noodle cart, which eventually expands into a food franchise. He has a son who has inherited Tai's goggles, making him the epilogue DigiDestined's leader. His son has a DemiVeemon as his partner Digimon.

 
 
 Yolei is the president of the Computer Club at Odaiba Elementary School. She lives in the same apartment building as T.K. and Cody, where her family runs a convenience store on the first floor. Her proficiency with computers and technical knowledge makes her resourceful to the team, but she can also be impulsive and idealistic.
 In the epilogue, Yolei becomes a housewife after she marries Ken, they have three children; the oldest a daughter with a Poromon and two sons, the older with a Minomon and a baby with a Leafmon.
 Yolei appears in the game Digimon Digital Card Battle, where her name listed as "Keely".

 
 
 Cody is the youngest member of the new DigiDestined living with his paternal grandfather and kendo master, who serves as a father figure in place of his deceased father Hiroki.
 Near the end of the series, Cody learns that his father was Yukio Oikawa's best friend. In the series' epilogue, Cody becomes a lawyer and has a daughter with Upamon as her partner Digimon.

 
 
 Ken is a prodigy from Tamachi who entered the Digital World as a child and traveled with Ryo Akiyama until he was implanted by a Dark Spore, a fragment of a Digimon named Milleniummon that they defeated. After his defeat, Ken returns to his normal appearance and later joins DigiDestined to stop Oikawa's group. In the series' epilogue, Ken becomes a detective and is married to Yolei with three children; the firstborn daughter with a Poromon and two sons, the older with a Minomon and a baby with a Leafmon.

 Partner Digimon 
This page only includes the forms shown in the anime. Many of these characters gained alternate digivolutions in spin off media.

 
 
 Veemon is a blue dragon-like Digimon and Davis' partner. Veemon, along with Hawkmon and Armadillomon, are the three Digimon of ancient times who were sealed away by Azulongmon, to be awakened again in a time of crisis. He is lighthearted and very brave, always determined to achieve his and Davis' goals. Veemon has a crush on Gatomon.
 is Veemon's Baby form, a tiny round dragon-like Digimon.
 is Veemon's In-training form, a bipedal but small dragon-like Digimon. Veemon takes this form whenever he returns to the Real World with Davis.
 is Veemon's Armor form when he uses the Digi-Egg of Courage to Digivolve, a bipedal dragon Digimon with flame-based attacks whose armor heavily resembles the Digi-Egg of Courage.
 is Veemon's Armor form when he uses the Digi-Egg of Friendship to Digivolve, a quadrupedal dragon Digimon with thunder-based attacks whose armor heavily resembles the Digi-Egg of Friendship.
 is Veemon's Armor form when he uses the Digi-Egg of Miracles to Digivolve, a Holy Knight Digimon with Mega-level powers whose armor heavily resembles the Digi-Egg of Miracles.
 is Veemon's Champion form, a humanoid dragon Digimon with a horn on his nose and white wings.
 is Veemon's Ultimate form, the DNA Digivolution between XV-mon and Stingmon, combining features from Dragon and Insect-type Digimon. Paildramon uses his Desperado Blaster to fight with his enemies.
 is Veemon's Mega form, Digivolved from Paildramon. Imperialdramon is a draconic quadrupedal Digimon with a pair of wings and the Positron Laser on his back.
 is a Mode Change of Imperialdramon: Dragon Mode, resembling a humanoid version of his previous form. The Positron Laser is now on his right arm.
 is a Mode Change of Imperialdramon: Fighter Mode, resembling a Paladin version of his previous form. Imperialdramon: Paladin Mode first appeared in Digimon Adventure 02: Revenge of Diaboromon, when Omnimon gives all his powers to him in order to destroy Armageddemon.

 
 
 Hawkmon is a hawk-like Digimon and Yolei's partner. He is very polite and gentlemanly; in the Japanese original, this makes him come off like a samurai, while in the dub he seems more like a British gentleman.  Compared to Yolei, he is down-to-earth and helps her stay grounded. 
 is Hawkmon's Baby form, who looks like a newborn bird Digimon.
 is Hawkmon's In-training form, a spherical bird-like Digimon that can fly at low heights. Hawkmon takes this form whenever he returns to the Real World with Yolei.
 is Hawkmon's Armor form when he uses the Digi-Egg of Love to Digivolve, a griffin-like Digimon with wind-based attacks whose helmet heavily resembles the Digi-Egg of Love. 
 is Hawkmon's Armor form when he uses the Digi-Egg of Sincerity to Digivolve, a shuriken-themed ninja Digimon whose design heavily resembles the Digi-Egg of Sincerity.
 is Hawkmon's Champion form, a giant eagle-like Digimon with two gigantic horns. 
 is Hawkmon's Ultimate form, the DNA Digivolution between Aquilamon and Gatomon. Silphymon is a harpy-like Digimon who combines Gatomon's ears and Aquilamon's legs, tailfeathers, and wingfeathers.

 
 
 Armadillomon is an armadillo-like Digimon and Cody's partner. He has a laid-back personality and speaks with a Nagoya dialect, usually ending his sentences with "da gya". In the English dub, he speaks with a Southern United States accent. His easygoing nature is a sharp contrast to Cody's serious personality. 
 is Armadillomon's Baby form, a spherical seed-like Digimon with a tail over his head.
 is Armadillomon's In-training form, a round axolotl-like Digimon. Armadillomon takes this form whenever he returns to the Real World with Cody.
 is Armadillomon's Armor form when he uses the Digi-Egg of Knowledge to Digivolve, a mole cricket-like Digimon armed with drills on his mouth and hands, whose design heavily resembles the Digi-Egg of Knowledge.
 is Armadillomon's Armor form when he uses the Digi-Egg of Reliability to Digivolve, a submarine-themed Digimon whose design heavily resembles the Digi-Egg of Reliability.
 is Armadillomon's Champion form, an ankylosaur-like Digimon with an iron spiked ball mace on the end of its tail.
 is Armadillomon's Ultimate form, the DNA Digivolution between Ankylomon and Angemon. Shakkoumon is a Shakōki-dogū-based Digimon who combines Ankylomon's armor with Angemon's holy powers.

 
 
 Wormmon is a caterpillar Digimon and Ken's partner. He possesses the ability to crawl and generates silk from his mouth. When Ken becomes the Digimon Emperor, Wormmon stays by his side hoping that he will return to his normal self. Realizing Ken has lost sight of himself, Wormmon sacrifices himself to allow Magnamon to destroy Kimeramon. He is later reincarnated at Primary Village and meets a reformed Ken. 
 is Wormmon's Baby form, a small green Digimon with a long tail resembling a leaf and a pink pacifier on his mouth.
 is Wormmon's In-training form, a bagworm moth larva Digimon.
 is Wormmon's Champion form, an insectoid Digimon with a muscular body structure.
 is Wormmon's Ultimate form, the DNA Digivolution between XV-mon and Stingmon, combining features from Dragon and Insect-type Digimon. Paildramon uses his Desperado Blaster to fight with his enemies.
 is Wormmon's Mega form, Digivolved from Paildramon. Imperialdramon is a draconic quadrupedal Digimon with a pair of wings and the Positron Laser on his back.
 is a Mode Change of Imperialdramon: Dragon Mode, resembling a humanoid version of his previous form. The Positron Laser is now on his right arm.
 is a Mode Change of Imperialdramon: Fighter Mode, resembling a Paladin version of his previous form. Imperialdramon: Paladin Mode first appeared in Digimon Adventure 02: Revenge of Diaboromon, when Omnimon gives all his powers to him in order to destroy Armageddemon.

 Adventure tri. protagonists 
 
 
 Meiko is a DigiDestined from Tottori, who transfers to Tsukishima High School. A shy but gentle teenage girl, Meiko always prefer to run instead of facing the problems. Meiko's presence keeps Meicoomon's feral behavior in check.

 Partner Digimon 
 
 
 Meicoomon is a maine coon-like Champion-level Digimon and Meiko's partner, known by the codename "Libra". Meicoomon contains a shard of Apocalymon's data within her body, which causes an infection in the Digital World. This forces Homeostasis and Hackmon to deem Meicoomon a threat while King Drasil and Dark Gennai see her as a means to destroy humanity. Being separated from Meiko for long periods of time, or seeing her partner harmed, causes her to go feral as Apocalymon's influence manifests itself as she transformed into  when she destroyed Leomon. Meicoomon later digivolved into her Ultimate form,  before being exposed to the Digital World's reboot. But Meicoomon retains her memories of Meiko which Dark Gennai exploits to have her fully embrace Apocalymon's influence. Though Gatomon was removed, Ordinemon is corrupted by King Drasil's viruses and is destroyed by Omnimon with only the Apocalymon data fragment remaining.

 
 Ordinemon is a Mega-level Fallen Angel Digimon born from the forced Dark DNA Digivolution between Raguelmon and Ophanimon: Falldown Mode. A feminine humanoid Digimon with DNA-strand like limbs whose sole purpose is to nullifying existence with the miasma emitted from her wings. Ordinemon's power allows the Real World to begin being swallowed up by the Digital World. According to Hackmon, Ordinemon was reduced to a mindless monster from her inability to control her power, although some connection to her partners remains. Although Jesmon extracts Gatomon from her, Ordinemon is unable to revert to Meicoomon when further corrupted by King Drasil synthesizing viruses into her body, forcing the Digidestined to destroy her and end Meicoomon’s suffering.

 Film protagonists 
  
  
 Willis is an American DigiDestined who grew up in Denver and currently lives in New York. He is slightly arrogant and tends to bottle up his feelings, but is clearly a kindhearted person who cares for his friends and Digimon. Willis owns twin partner Digimon: Gummymon and Kokomon. When Kokomon gets infected by a virus, he digivolves into Wendigomon. However, Davis and his friends save Kokomon from being infected.

 Partner Digimon 
  
 
 Terriermon is a one-horned lop-eared rabbit Digimon who is one of Willis' partners. He first appeared as Gummymon during Kokomon's disappearance.
: Terriermon's champion form, a Beast Digimon resembling a bipedal lop-eared rabbit warrior whose forearms bear a pair of cybernetic Gatling guns that he uses in his attacks, such as the move "Gargo Laser".
: Terriermon's Armor form when he uses the Digi-Egg of Destiny to Digivolve. He is a cyborg Digimon resembling an upright jackrabbit clad in heavy cybernetic armor with high speed. It uses long armored radar-like ears.

 Antagonists 
 Adventure antagonists 
 
 
 Devimon is a Champion-level devil Digimon with long arms and bat wings. He can enslave other Digimon with his "Touch of Evil" claw attack and by embedding them with Black Gears. They are used to control each part of File Island. Devimon lives on top of Infinity Mountain, using Orgemon and a Black Gear-infected Leomon as his enforcers in an initial attempt to kill the DigiDestined, before using the gears to fracture File Island in order to separate the DigiDestined from each other. After the DigiDestined regroup, Devimon absorbs most of the Black Gears into his body so he can increase his size, only to be destroyed by Angemon. In Digimon Adventure 02, Ken finds Devimon's remains and uses his data to complete Kimeramon. In Digimon Adventure tri., "Our Future", a Devimon appears to fight HolyAngemon.

 
 
 Etemon is a monkey-like Ultimate-level puppet Digimon with sunglasses, along an Elvis Presley accent in the English version, whose signature attack Love Seranade allows him to overwhelm other Digimon with his singing voice. A charismatic egotist who often abuses his Gazimon subordinates, Etemon rules over a portion of the Server Continent using the Dark Network to keep tabs on the DigiDestined. The DigiDestined later infiltrate Etemon's pyramid base where the core of the Dark Network is located, freeing Etemon’s nemesis Datamon who later causes the Dark Network to absorb everything within reach in a final attempt to destroy Etemon. But Datamon’s final gambit only merged Etemon and the Dark Network into , who ends up in another dimension when taking an attack from MetalGreymon forms a vortex that also sent Tai and his partner to the Real World. Etemon later returns to the Digital World after absorbing the Dark Network’s energies to become the Mega-level cyborg Digimon , whose body is coated in ChromeDigizoid metal. MetalEtemon proceeds to hunt down Joe and Mimi after they separated from the others, only to be destroyed by Zudomon and SaberLeomon after fatally wounding the latter.

 
 
 Myotismon is an aggressive and evil vampire-like Ultimate-level undead Digimon who serves as the DigiDestineds' nemesis, a heartless monster able to create alpha bat constructs in his signature Grizly Wing attack. Myotismon first appears in the series to have DemiDevimon keep the children occupied while establishing an army of Digimon to enter the human world and kill the eighth DigiDestined,via his having his forces scout Tokyo. After learning Gatomon is the eighth DigiDestined's partner, he creates a fog barrier around Odaiba to personally take over the district before a captured Kari is brought before him. The battle that ensued results in Myotismon being physically destroyed by Angewomon, only for his bats to reconstitute him as the nearly mindless Mega-level Demon Beast Digimon . Though destroyed after Tai and Matt acquired the ability to digivolve their partners to Mega-level, Myotismon's soul survives and tricks Yukio Oikawa into being his host by playing on the human's desires.
 After a few years of directing Oikawa into executing his plan to ensure his return to power, Myotismon reveals himself in the World of Dreams. He absorbs the bloomed Dark Flowers Oikawa cultivated in a select group of children to become the robot-like Dark Lord-type Digimon . After killing Arukenimon and Mummymon in cold blood, he attempts to trap the new DigiDestined in illusions, but Davis breaks the others free. Myotismon battles the DigiDestined in the Digital World, but loses power with his body disintegrating as the Dark Flower children's dreams overcome their negativity. Myotismon's spirit is destroyed once and for all by Imperialdramon using power from all of the world's DigiDestined.
 is a Rookie-level blue bat Digimon and Myotismon's servant, initially sent by his master to keep the DigidDestined from regrouping while preventing them from activating their Crests. He then accompanied Myotismon to Tokyo and helped in the search for the eight child. DemiDevimon escapes Myotismon's initial defeat and oversees the prophecy that leads to his resurrection as VenomMyotismon, who then devours DemiDevimon. DemiDevimon is 
 is an Ultimate-level reaper-like Digimon and one of Myotismon's primary minions in his search for the eighth child. Phantomon leads the Bakemon guarding the convention center and participates in several battles with the DigiDestined, often emerging as the victor. During the final battle with Myotismon at the Fuji TV station, Phantomon is destroyed by Angemon's Hand of Fate when he was caught in the pathway of the attack meant for Myotismon. Phantomon is 

 
 The Dark Masters are a group consisting of four evil Mega-level Digimon who are extensions of Apocalymon. In Digimon Adventure tri., they are revealed to have made a previous attempt to kill the first DigiDestined but are defeated after Tapirmon sacrificed himself so his fellow Digimon can digivolve into the Digimon Sovereigns. In 1999, the Dark Masters take advantage of the DigiDestined's absence by sealing away the Sovereigns and converting the Digital World into Spiral Mountain which is divided into four territories. As the DigiDestined learn, each Dark Master's defeat causes their domain to dissolve and be restored to its original form.

 is a giant Cyborg variant of Seadramon covered in golden armor called Chrome Digizoid. MetalSeadramon is served by his Deep Savers army, consisting of his general Scorpiomon and a group of Divermon. Extremely stubborn, temperamental, and arrogant, he attempts to destroy the DigiDestined. MetalSeadramon is eventually destroyed by WarGreymon ripping through the Dark Master's mouth. In Digimon Adventure tri., "Loss", a post-reboot infected MetalSeadramon serves Dark Gennai, and is defeated by WarGreymon and MetalGarurumon. 
 is a Puppet-type Digimon inspired by Pinocchio with a playful personality despite being childish with a rotten temper, treating his Wind Guardians minions Kiwimon, Blossomon, Mushroomon, Floramon, Deramon, Cherrymon, and RedVegiemon as disposable playthings. He lives in a toy-like mansion which can transform into a giant wooden robot. While he can control others with strings and has an arsenal of real firearms, he wields the Bullet Hammer mallet, which uses energy blasts. When the DigiDestined enter his domain, Puppetmon abducts T.K. to have a playmate in a life-and-death game of hide and seek before the boy tricked him and escaped. Following the DigiDestined splitting up, upset from Cherrymon warning him to underestimate their friendship, Puppetmon is forced to flee Tai's group when they destroyed his house and ends up being killed by MetalGarurumon. 
 is a dinosaur-like Machine Digimon armed with his two back-mounted Infinity Cannons, possessing an emotionless, cold, and calculating mind. He often resorts to military strategies in combat, including scorched earth strategies. He rules over Spiral Mountain's cityscape, and commands the Metal Empire, which includes WaruMonzaemon, Megadramon, Gigadramon, several Hagurumon, and a multitude of Mekanorimon and Tankmon. . Machinedramon targets the DigiDestined as they explore the city, leading them to fall into the city's lower levels. He destroys hundreds of Numemon previously enslaved by his minion WaruMonzaemon, before being defeated by WarGreymon. In Digimon Adventure tri., "Loss", a post-reboot infected Machinedramon is summoned by Dark Gennai and destroyed by Phoenixmon, HerculesKabuterimon, and Seraphimon.
 is the leader of the Dark Masters, a Majin-type Digimon dressed as a colourful pierrot. He possesses a number of magical tricks and wields four swords with. He maintains an upbeat but sadistic sense of humor, displaying a passion for fighting. Four years prior to the events of the first series, Piedmon led an army of Gardromon and Mekanorimon in attacking the Agents' base. He stole all the crests and tags but Gennai protected the Digi-Eggs. Piedmon lives on top of Spiral Mountain in a large observatory-funhouse building in a rocky wasteland, served by his demonic army, the Nightmare Soldiers, consisting of his right-hand LadyDevimon and a multitude of Vilemon. However, after his forces were defeated by the DigiDestined's army of Digimon allies, he is sealed away via MagnaAngemon's Gate of Destiny after being sent flying into it by WarGreymon and MetalGarurumon's attacks. 

 
 
 Apocalymon is a Mega-level Digimon attached to a large structure from the waist down who serves as the first season's final antagonist that is responsible for the chaos in the Digital World. He was born within a void from the data of Digimon who died because they were unable to digivolve and adapt, becoming consumed by their collective sadness and rage as he grew to bitterly hate the Digital World itself. In the Japanese version, he refers to itself as "we".
 Besides his ability to regenerate, Apocalymon can use his structure's claw-like attachment to replicate the attacks of other Digimon while using his "reverse digivolve" to revert the DigiDestined's Digimon to their default forms. After replicating Devimon's Dark Claw to take the DigiDestined's Crests and destroy them, Apocalymon turns the DigiDestined and their Digimon into data. But the DigiDestined use the power of their Crests within their hearts to restore and heavily damage Apocalymon. He attempts to destroy everything with his final attack Total Annihilation, only for the power of the Digivices to confine the resulting explosion.
 In Digimon Adventure tri., it is revealed that a shard of Apocalymon's data survived and incorporated itself into the core of Meicoomon, whom King Drasil and Dark Gennai exploit in their plan to destroy humanity. The plan failed with Meicoomon's demise, but Dark Gennai recovers the shard while taking his leave as he considers allying himself with either Daemon or Diaboromon.

 Adventure 02 antagonists 
 
  
 Kimeramon is a chimera Digimon created by the Digimon Emperor to be his ideal partner Digimon in taking over the Digital World. Kimeramon has Kabuterimon's head, Greymon's lower jaw and torso, Garurumon's back legs, Monochromon's tail, one of Kuwagamon's left arms, SkullGreymon's right arm, Airdramon's wings, Angemon's top wings, and MetalGreymon's hair. After acquiring the data remains of Devimon, manifesting in his upper arms, Ken completes Kimeramon. However, Devimon's data makes him uncontrollable. When Davis uses the Digi-Egg of Miracles, Magnamon uses Wormmon's power to destroy Kimeramon.

 
 
 Oikawa is a human aware of the Digimon's existence. As a child, he and Cody Hida's father, Hiroki, promised to visit the Digital World together. After Hiroki's death, Oikawa makes a deal with Myotismon to enter the Digital World, leading him to becoming possessed. Under Myotismon's influence, Oikawa creates Arukenimon and Mummymon. They then abduct various kids to absorb power from the Dark Spores implanted in them. When Oikawa tries to enter the Digital World, he instead enters the World of Dreams and is mortally wounded by Myotismon. After the DigiDestined permanently defeat MaloMyotismon, Oikawa meets Datrinimon and uses the World of Dreams to convert himself into data-based butterflies, restoring the Digital World.
 is a mummy Digimon who has a crush on Arukenimon. Created by Oikawa, he wears a hat, royal blue coat, and wields a cane. He is finally killed by MaloMyotismon when he tries to avenge Arukenimon. 
 is a drider-like Digimon who is cunning, intelligent, and temperamental. After secretly overseeing Ken's actions as the Digimon Emperor, she appears before the DigiDestined in her human form and uses her "Spirit Needle" hair to transform Control Spires into enemy Digimon. In the end, Arukenimon is brutally tortured and then killed by MaloMyotismon.  
 is an artificial black Digimon clone of WarGreymon, created by Arukenimon from a hundred Control Spires. He becomes self-aware and undergoes an existential crisis. He tries to find purpose by battling Azulongmon and destroys six of the seven the Destiny Stones to face him. When Azulongmon appears with the DigiDestined's help and defeats him, BlackWarGreymon is reprimanded for endangering their realities. He later confronts Oikawa for disrupting the balance of both the Real and Digital worlds. After being fatally wounded by a Myotismon-possessed Oikawa, BlackWarGreymon sacrifices himself to become a seal to the Highton View Terrace gate in order to prevent Myotismon from entering the Digital World.

 
 The Daemon Corps are a group named after their master, Daemon, and consisted of him and three Virus Ultimate-level Digimon. They appeared on December 26, 2002, in Japan to retrieve the Dark Spore within Ken.
 is the leader of the Daemon Corps, a wrathful Mega-level demon lord Digimon whose robes conceal his true appearance. He is able to traverse between worlds. Ken uses his inner darkness to change the portal's location to the Dark Ocean, trapping Daemon there. Daemon is 
 is a skeletal Fallen Angel Digimon. He attacks the city, and uses his Nail Bone attack to paralyze Imperialdramon: Dragon Mode, only to be destroyed by Imperialdramon: Fighter Mode. 
 is a femme fatale-like Fallen Angel Digimon with darkness-based attacks. In the original series, LadyDevimon is a member of the Nightmare Soldiers as Piedmon's most loyal minion, serving as his bodyguard. She engaged on a catfight with Angewomon and almost won, but when MegaKabuterimon aids Angewomon, she finally destroyed her. In Adventure 02, another LadyDevimon appeared as a member of the Daemon Corps, attacking the highways and engaging in a new catfight with Angewomon, but retreats when WereGarurumon and Garudamon appeared. When she resurfaces in order to take Ken from Yukio Oikawa, LadyDevimon is finally destroyed by Silphymon. 
 is a squid-like Demon Digimon with ink-based attacks. In Adventure 02, MarineDevimon is a member of the Daemon Corps who first appeared  to menace a cruise ship on which a wedding was taking place. He first fights Angemon and Submarimon with no problems, but retreats when Zudomon appears. When he resurfaces in order to take Ken from Yukio Oikawa, MarineDevimon is finally destroyed by Shakkoumon. 

 Adventure tri. antagonists 

 
 King Drasil is a host computer being in the form of a tree who serves as the antagonist of Digimon Adventure tri., working with Dark Gennai to force Meicoomon into embracing Apocalymon's data fragment in a scheme to destroy humanity and absorb the Real World. However, the plan fails after Omnimon destroys Ordinemon and Drasil is shut down by Homeostasis.
 is an evil shapeshifter clone of Gennai who believes humans would eventually enslave the Digimon. After placing the real Gennai in a stasis pod alongside Davis, Yolei, Cody and Ken, initially assuming the real Ken's Digimon Emperor form, Dark Gennai helps King Drasil in his scheme of using Meicoomon to destroy humanity. Following Ordinemon's destruction, Dark Gennai recovers the fragment of Apocalymon's data and leaves to seek out new allies from the DigiDestined's enemies like Daemon and Diaboromon. 
 is a black-armored exalted-knight Digimon who appears in Digimon Adventure tri., armed with the Holy Sword Gradalpha and the  broadsword. He is King Drasil's servant who defeats Davis, Yolei, Cody and Ken when they were lured into a trap by Himekawa. Alphamon later makes attempts to capture Meicoomon, from being driven off by Omnimon and later ended up in an all-out fight with Meicoomon, Jesmon, and Omnimon.

 
 
 Maki is Daigo's ex-girlfriend and a government agent from the Incorporate Administrative Agency. She hides crucial information concerning Meicoomon's power and the location of the missing DigiDestined. Loss revealed that Maki was one of the DigiDestined predating Tai's group, serving as Homeostasis' medium like Kari. She became disillusioned over her partner Tapirmon needing to sacrifice himself for the Digital World. This influenced Maki to ally herself with Dark Gennai to revive Tapirmon through the Digital World's reboot, arranging Meicoomon's abduction to commence the event and concealing the disappearance of Davis and the others new DigiDestined from Tai's group. Though the reboot succeeds, Himekawa suffers a mental breakdown over Tapirmon not remembering her and is last seen descending into the Dark Ocean.

 Film antagonists 
 
 
 Parrotmon is a large bird Digimon, who invaded Highton View Terrace in 1996. He is defeated by Greymon, but his presence led to higher powers in the Digital World to choose the eight DigiDestined. He appears in the first part of Digimon: The Movie. 14 years later, in Digimon Adventure: Last Evolution Kizuna Parrotmon returned to try and get revenge though it is defeated by MetalGreymon, Angewomon, Angemon, and Garurumon.

 
 
 Diaboromon is a computer virus Digimon who first appears in Digimon Adventure: Our War Game! (the second part of Digimon: The Movie). First appearing as a Digi-Egg, he invades the Internet after hatching into Kuramon and wreaks havoc across Japan's electrical systems while Digivolving to Keramon, Infermon, and finally Diaboromon. He launches nuclear missiles to wipe out the DigiDestined and potentially spark World War III. However, Omnimon destroys Diaboromon and his clones, causing the missiles to crash harmlessly into the water.
 In Revenge of Diaboromon Diaboromon returns where he is confronted by Omnimon, Angemon, and Angewomon. When he is struck down by Omnimon again, he sends millions of Kuramon into Tokyo to combine into Armageddemon in order to destroy it. Imperialdramon Paladin Mode defeats Armageddemon.

 
 
 Wendigomon is a beast Digimon who appears in Digimon Adventure 02: Digimon Hurricane Landing!! / Transcendent Evolution!! The Golden Digimentals! (the third part of Digimon: The Movie). Terriermon's twin, the trainee-level Kokomon was Willis' other partner Digimon who mysteriously disappeared. He resurfaced in his corrupted Champion-level state and abducted any DigiDestined with an original Digivice to his pocket dimension. Wendigomon's goal was to "go back" to how things were, Willis' attempt to reason with him caused him to digivolve into corrupted versions of Antylamon and Cherubimon'''. Magnamon and Rapidmon managed to defeat Cherubimon and he resurrects as a Digi-Egg.

 
 
 The main antagonist in Digimon Adventure: Last Evolution Kizuna. She is a scientist furthering Digimon research at a University in New York. Her partner used to be Morphomon, who was vanished from the Real World when Menoa received her admission letter to university. That event drove Menoa mad to the point of creating Eosmon, with the intention of robbing the consciousnesses from every DigiDestined around the world, as she believes to be preventing them from suffering the same fate as she and Morphomon did. Once Eosmon was destroyed, Menoa sees a brief vision of Morphomon. Afterwards, Menoa was arrested by the authorities.
  is an artificial Digimon that appears in Digimon Adventure: Last Evolution Kizuna, created by Menoa Belucci in the image of Morphomon. Initially a Champion Level Digimon that digivolved to its Ultimate form during its first battle against the DigiDestined. During the final battle, Ultimate Level Eosmon cloned itself. When the DigiDestined started destroying the clones, the desperate Menoa allowed herself to fuse with the original Eosmon, which digivolved to its Mega form. The majority of the clones as well as the Mega Level Eosmon were finally destroyed by Agumon (Bond of Bravery) and Gabumon (Bond of Friendship).

 Recurring characters 
 Digital World 
 
 Young 
 Old 
 Gennai is a data-based human and a guide of the DigiDestined. Four years ago, Gennai protected all eight Digi-Eggs from Piedmon and sends them to File Island, though he accidentally loses Gatomon's egg in the process. As an elder, he assigns them to retrieve all lost crests and tags at the Server Continent. After Tai and his friends destroy Apocalymon, Gennai sends the kids home, suggesting that they leave their partners in the Digital World.
 In Digimon Adventure 02, Gennai uses the DigiCore given from Azulongmon and regains his youthful appearance.

 
 Homeostasis is a digital lifeform and one of the host computers that run the Digital World. First appearing in Adventure, she possessed Kari to show her the history of the Digital World.
 In the Digimon Adventure tri films, Homeostasis is the one who had the Digimon of the original DigiDestined digivolved to the Harmonious Ones during a losing battle against the Dark Masters. While the DigiDestined consider Homeostasis an ally, they eventually realize the being does not share their ideals and acts only to protect the Digital World at any cost. Homeostasis later forces King Drasil to shut down after Ordinemon's defeat for the program's role in the crisis.

 
 
 A Champion-level fire spirit Digimon and a neighbor of the Yokomon Village living in Mount Miharashi on File Island. He is possessed by a Black Gear, but Birdramon destroys it. He later joins Mimi's army to fight the Dark Masters.

 
 
 An Ultimate-level cyborg-type Digimon whom the DigiDestined meet in a factory on File Island, he is possessed by a Black Gear, but Kabuterimon destroys it. Later, Andromon aids the DigiDestined in their fight against the Dark Masters. In Digimon Adventure 02, Andromon is possessed by a Dark Ring, but comes across Tai, T.K., and Kari in a domed city, each face activating part of his old memory, which he recalls as a photograph he took of their last meeting four years ago. After breaking free from the Dark Ring, Andromon destroys the Dark Spire and remains in the domed city to reprogram the Guardromon that were controlled by the Dark Rings.

 
 
 A Champion-level humanoid lion-like Digimon and Ogremon's long-term rival, living on File Island. In Digimon Adventure, Leomon is brainwashed by Devimon, but Tai and Matt free him by using their Digivices. Later, he helps them defeat Devimon. Leomon eventually gains the ability to warp-digivolve into SaberLeomon. Though sacrificing himself in defeating Metal Etemon, Leomon is revived at Primary Village following Apocalymon's defeat. In Digimon Adventure tri., Leomon visits the human world, where he is destroyed by Meicoomon, who senses his infection.

 
 
 Leomon's rival and a Champion-level ogre-like Digimon living on File Island. He is a brutish, aggressive character, but shows a sense of honor and admiration for Leomon. They are possessed by Devimon, but are freed after Devimon's defeat. After Joe and Mimi recruit Ogremon, he helps them defeat MetalEtemon and later Piedmon before becoming a wanderer after Apocalymon’s defeat.

 
 
 A Champion-level one-eyed centaur Digimon in a helmet with pipes on its humanoid back, living in an ancient temple on File Island and knowledgeable of the history of the Digivices. After Izzy and Mimi destroy the Black Gear on him, Centarumon shares his knowledge.

 
 
 A Rookie-level rabbit-like Digimon and the caretaker of Primary Village, where all Digimon are born from Digi-Eggs. After the DigiDestined defeat the Dark Masters and Apocalymon, Elecmon returns home.

 
 
 A Champion-level whale-like Digimon first encountered by the DigiDestined after leaving File Island. Controlled by a remaining Black Gear, Whamon swallowed the group, but was set free by Tai's Digivice. Remorseful, Whamon helped the DigiDestined locate the Tags and carried them to the continent of Server. When the DigiDestined returned during the invasion of the Dark Masters, Whamon reappeared to rescue them from MetalSeadramon and his Divermon. Whamon carried the group inside of his own body to safety, only to be attacked by MetalSeadramon. Whamon departed while Zudomon destroyed the Divermon and WarGreymon fought MetalSedramon. When WarGreymon was almost crushed by the Dark Master, Whamon reappeared and rammed the giant sea serpent, saving his friend and enraging MetalSedramon who blasted Whamon through the head. WarGreymon quickly destroyed MetalSedramon, but Whamon was mortally wounded and begged the DigiDestined to save the world with his last words. In Digimon Adventure 02, Whamon was recruited to save most of the DigiDestined from an off-shore oil rig that was under attack by a MegaSedramon. While the original version lists this as a different Whamon, the English dub changed it to the Whamon that the DigiDestined knew.

 
 
 Piximon is an Ultimate-level famous trainer in the Digital World. He trains the DigiDestined to work together, and helps Tai and Agumon face their fears of Digivolving after Tai forced Greymon to digivolve into SkullGreymon. Piximon sacrifices himself to save the DigiDestined from the Dark Masters.

 
 
 Wizardmon is a Champion-level Digimon and Gatomon's friend who accompanied Myotismon's forces to the Real World. He is killed by Myotismon while protecting Kari and Gatomon from him. In Digimon Adventure 02, Wizardmon appears as a ghost at the Fuji TV Station, telling the DigiDestined a cryptic prophecy concerning Myotismon's return and about Ken's redemption through the power of a Golden Armor Digi-Egg.

 
 
 Azulongmon, a Mega-level, is one of the four Digimon Sovereigns and is the ruling guardian of Digital World's Eastern Hemisphere (based on Seiryuu). In Digimon Adventure 02, the Sovereigns were revealed to have been sealed away by the Dark Masters during the events for the first series with the DigiDestined sacrificing their Crest powers. During BlackWarGreymon's assault on the Destiny Stones, Azulongmon was freed by the DigiDestined and defeated BlackWarGreymon. He loaned the DigiDestined two of his DigiCores, allowing the DigiDestined to digivolve their partners past their Champion forms. In Digimon Adventure tri., Azulongmon and the Sovereigns were originally the partner Digimon of the first DigiDestined.

 
 
 Digitamamon is an Ultimate-level Digimon and the owner of a diner where he is served by a Vegiemon. In Digimon Adventure, he forces Joe and Gomamon into working at his diner to pay off the debt they owe him, only to be bribed by DemiDevimon into keeping them in the restaurant. DemiDevimon's sabotages make things difficult for Joe and Matt. Digitamamon is defeated by WereGarurumon while Vegiemon flees. In Digimon Adventure 02, Digitamamon returns where he now has a different restaurant. He did get into an argument with Yolei about the payment differences. Digitamamon falls victim to a Dark Spiral that is in his shell, but is freed by Shurimon. He later opens a new Chinese restaurant with a Tapirmon, using the waters of a spring that conceals the last Destiny Stone as the secret ingredient to his popular noodle soup.

 
 
 A Rookie-level tapir-like Digimon who works at the Chinese Restaurant in Digimon Adventure 02. Another Tapirmon appears in Digimon Adventure tri. as Maki's partner Digimon, able to digivolve into . He sacrifices himself enable his comrades to defeat the Dark Masters as the Sovereigns, with Maki managing to revive Tapirmon by rebooting Digital World. But the revived Tapirmon has no memory of Maki or their time together as a result.

 
 
 A Champion-level slug-like mutant Digimon living in the sewers. They have difficulty adapting to sunlight. They chased the DigiDestined at File Island, but came to their aid against Monzaemon after their leader meets Mimi. A group of Numemon appear as slaves for WaruMonzaemon in Machinedramon's city, but rebel against him, praising Kari as their savior. Machinedramon then destroys the rebelling Nunemon.

 ,  and 
 Gekomon: 
 Otamamon: 
 ShogunGekomon: 
 A group of amphibian Digimon that live in a castle, the Rookie-level Otamamon and Champion-level Gekomon serve Ultimate-level ShogunGekomon. After being awoken by Mimi, ShogunGekomon went on a rampage until MetalGreymon's Giga Blaster sent him back to sleep. Following the formation of Spiral Mountain, many Otamamon and Gekomon lost their home and ShogunGekomon when it was destroyed and ultimately aided the DigiDestined in their final battle with Piedmon. In Digimon Adventure 02, ShogunGekomon falls under the influence of a Dark Spiral before he was freed after being tricked into destroying a local Control Spire.

 Sukamon and Chuumon
 Sukamon: 
 Chuumon: 
 A pair composed by the champion-level mutant Digimon Sukamon and the rookie-level beast Digimon Chuumon, both relatively harmless despite being obnoxious. Mimi first encountered the duo while separated from the others, with the two quickly developing a crush on her. They later reappeared as recruits for Myotismon's army, but quickly abandoned it. When the Dark Masters created Spiral Mountain, Sukamon fell to his death in a deep crevice with Chuumon informing the DigiDestined of what occurred in their absence. Chuumon then later sacrifices himself to save a devastated Mimi from Piedmon's knife. The two were eventually reborn and resurfaced in Digimon Adventure 02 after Shurimon freed Digitamamon from a Dark Spiral. The two once again attempted to get Mimi to go out with them before she punches them clear across a lake in response.

 
 
 A rookie-level Digimon who serves as Homeostasis' messenger and observer, able to warp-digivolve into the exalted knight . While consider Homeostasis' orders absolute, he is moved enough by the resolve of the DigiDestined that he helps them in preventing Ordinemon from escaping into the Digital World while extracting Gatomon from the monster.

 Human World 
  and 
 Susumu: 
 Yuko: 
 Susumu and Yuko are Tai and Kari's parents. They are named after their voice actors in the original television series, Susumu Chiba and Yuko Mizutani.

 
 
 Hiroaki is Matt and T.K.'s father. He works as a reporter at Fuji TV and tends to be a workaholic, but has a nice demeanor. He finds out about his sons' connection to the Digimon during Myotismon's invasion. He is named after his voice actor in the television series, Hiroaki Hirata.

 
 
 Nancy is Matt and T.K.'s mother and a newspaper reporter. In Digimon Adventure 02, she moved to Odaiba.

 
 
 Kinu is Matt and T.K.'s grandmother.

 
 
 Michel is Matt and T.K.'s grandfather and notes that his wife plans on re-roofing their home on Christmas.

 
 
 Haruhiko is Sora's father and an anthropology professor at Kyoto University. He researches information on the Digital World.

 
 
 Toshiko is Sora's mother, who urged Sora to quit soccer and do flower arranging after she suffered an injury. This initially causes a rift between the two until Sora realizes her mother truly loves her. She is named after her voice actress in the television series, Toshiko Fujita.

  and 
 Masami: 
 Kae: 
 Masami and Kae are Izzy's adoptive parents. After Masami and Kae lost their son, they adopted Izzy, who also lost his biological parents to a car accident. When Izzy overheard them discussing this as a child, he felt distant from them until he learnt to understand that they truly love him like their own son. They are named after their voice actors in the television series, Masami Kikuchi and Kae Araki.

  
 
 Satoe is Mimi's father.

 
 
 Satoe is Mimi's mother.

 Jim Kido
 
 Jim is Joe's older brother. In the original Japanese version, Joe had two older brothers, but in the English dub, both brothers were made into a single character, although they're both shown in "A Million Points of Light". In Digimon Adventure 02, Joe also had another older brother, who is the eldest in the family and is also a college student working with Sora's father, Haruhiko Takenouchi. In the drama CD Michi e no Armor Shinka, they go on a date with June and Yolei's older sisters and eventually get their own Digimon in the drama CD Digimon Adventure: Original Stories.

 
 
 June is Davis' older sister and a fan of the Teen-Age Wolves. She had a one-sided crush on Matt, but stopped pursuing him when she witnessed him saving Sora after Digimon crashed the Teen-Age Wolves' concert. June starts a relationship with Jim. She eventually gets her own Digimon in the drama CD Digimon Adventure: Original Stories.

 
 
 Chikara is Cody's paternal grandfather living with the boy and his daughter-in-law Fumiko. He trains Cody in kendo, and serves as a father figure in place of his son and police officer Hiroki.

 
 
 Fumiko is Cody's widowed mother she flew with her father-in-law and son to London to retrieve Hiroki's remains.

 
 
 Sam is Ken's late older brother and a child prodigy who died in a car accident, his death having a profound effect on Ken as the Dark Spore emulated his desire to be like his brother with his Digimon Emperor attire modeled after Sam.

 Mochizuki Family
 Professor Mochizuki:  
 Meiko's Mother: 
 Meiko's father is a professor, who had a failed experiment on Meicoomon. The couple moved to Odaiba afterwards with Meiko afterwards.

 
 
 Michael is a DigiDestined residing in New York and a friend of Mimi's. In 1999, Michael witnessed Gorillamon climbing the Empire State Building, leading him to become a DigiDestined and partner with Betamon. When Digimon started appearing around the world, Michael helped Davis and Mimi round up the ones in New York and battle a berserk Cherrymon.

 
 
 A main character in the Digimon Adventure tri. films. Daigo is Tai's substitute teacher and a government agent from the Incorporate Administrative Agency. He is described as warm, friendly, compassionate, and light-hearted. Loss revealed that Daigo was the leader of the original DigiDestined predating Tai's group, partnered with the Digimon that would become Baihumon. After falling off a canyon cliff and waking up in an underground facility, a mortally wounded Daigo dies in an explosion after sending Tai, Davis, Yolei, Cody and Ken back to the Real World.

 
 
 A main character in Digimon Adventure: Last Evolution Kizuna''.

Notes

References 

Adventure